São Francisco Xavier is a railway station in São Francisco Xavier, Rio de Janeiro which is serviced by the Supervia.

History 
The station was opened in 1861. For many years, this station was the terminus for the Linha Auxiliar (Auxiliary Line), which is now known as the Belford Roxo Line, before Alfredo Maia station (since demolished) opened in 1905. The Linha do Norte, which is now the Saracuruna and Vila Inhomirim lines, but which at the time continued to Petrópolis, also had its terminus at São Francisco Xavier before 1909. A train crash in 1935 would lead to rioters targeting the station.

Notable places nearby
 Museum of Samba
 Mangueira Olympic Village
 Mangueira Samba School

Platforms
Platform 1A: Towards Deodoro (Stopper)
Platform 1B: Towards Central do Brasil (Stopper)

References

External links 
 Supervia webpage

SuperVia stations